Bakay-Ata (before 2001: Ленинполь Leninpol) is a village in the Talas Region of Kyrgyzstan. Its population was 7,928 in 2021. It is the administrative seat of Bakay-Ata District. To the south, the Urmaral valley runs up into the Talas Ala-Too Range.

Population

References

Populated places in Talas Region